Baudouinia is a genus of flowering plants in the legume family, Fabaceae. It belongs to the subfamily Dialioideae.

Species
Baudouinia comprises the following species:
 Baudouinia capuronii Du Puy & R. Rabev.
 Baudouinia fluggeiformis Baill.
 Baudouinia louvelii R. Vig.
 Baudouinia orientalis R. Vig.
 Baudouinia rouxevillei H. Perrier
 Baudouinia sollyaeformis Baill.

Species names with uncertain taxonomic status
The status of the following species is unresolved:
 Baudouinia perrieri R.Vig. ex H.Perrier

References

Dialioideae
Fabaceae genera
Taxa named by Henri Ernest Baillon